Chua Ser Koon (1944 - ) is a Singapore historian, who specialise in the Japanese occupation of Singapore and Japan–Singapore relations or Japan–Malaysia relations. Known for her editorial of the book titled Xin Ma Huaren Kangri Shiliao (Malayan Chinese Resistance to Japan) 1937-1945.

Early life and education 
Chua was born in Singapore in 1944. In 1963, she entered the Nanyang University and major in history and graduated in 1967.

Chua also studied in Graduate School of Humanities and Sociology and Faculty of Letters, The University of Tokyo, Japan. She mainly studied history of Japan - South East Asia relations. Then in doctoral course, she major in history of Japanese military administration during the W.W.II period.

Career 
Chua worked at National Archives and Oral History Center of Singapore and took charge of the theme "Japanese Occupied Singapore".

Later she taught students in Reitaku University and Keio University. In 1997, she became the Professor of Tsuda University and taught international relations.

She mainly took charge of teaching and study of South East Asian history and overseas Chinese history.

Books 
Chua with Hsu Yun Tsiao edited the book titled Xin Ma Hua Ren Kang Ri Shi Liao (Singapore and Malayan Chinese Resistance to Japan) and the book later partly translated to Japanese language version.

References

Bibliography 

1944 births
Singaporean historians
Living people